Aleš Mertelj (born 22 March 1987) is a retired Slovenian footballer who played as a midfielder.

Club career
Mertelj started his career playing for Triglav Kranj and stayed there until he was acquired by Slovenian top division club, Koper. He played for Koper during the 2008–09 season, making 35 league appearances for the club and scoring three goals in the process. In 2009, he transferred to Maribor, where he stayed for nine years, winning 14 trophies with the club.

International career
Mertelj made his international debut for Slovenia on 26 May 2012 in a friendly match against Greece, coming in as a late substitute.

Personal life
Mertelj was born in Kranj in the northwestern Slovenia and has one brother and one sister. His older brother Sandi is a professional waterpolo player.

Honours
Maribor
Slovenian PrvaLiga: 2010–11, 2011–12, 2012–13, 2013–14, 2014–15, 2016–17
Slovenian Cup: 2009–10, 2011–12, 2012–13, 2015–16
Slovenian Supercup: 2009, 2012, 2013, 2014

References

External links
NZS profile 

1987 births
Living people
Sportspeople from Kranj
Slovenian footballers
Association football midfielders
Slovenia youth international footballers
Slovenia international footballers
Slovenian expatriate footballers
Slovenian Second League players
Slovenian PrvaLiga players
Czech First League players
NK Triglav Kranj players
FC Koper players
NK Maribor players
MFK Karviná players
Slovenian expatriate sportspeople in the Czech Republic
Expatriate footballers in the Czech Republic
Slovenian expatriate sportspeople in Austria
Expatriate footballers in Austria